The Wildest Show in the South: The Angola Prison Rodeo is a 1999 American short documentary film directed by Simeon Soffer. It was nominated for an Academy Award for Best Documentary Short.

References

External links

The Wildest Show in the South: The Angola Prison Rodeo at Seventh Art Releasing

1999 films
1999 independent films
1999 documentary films
1990s short documentary films
American short documentary films
American independent films
1990s English-language films
Rodeo in film
Documentary films about incarceration in the United States
1990s American films